The Aspa is a river in Perm Krai, Russia, a left tributary of Iren, which in turn is a tributary of Sylva. Main tributaries: Uya, Klyuchyovka (right), Usekay (left).

References 

Rivers of Perm Krai